Socialist Zionists can refer to:
 Adherents of Socialist Zionism (Labor Zionism), a major ideological and political current in the history of Zionism and Israel
 Adherents of the Zionist Socialist Workers Party, a Jewish revolutionary party in pre-1917 Russia